Psalm 23 is the 23rd psalm of the Book of Psalms, beginning in English in the King James Version: "The Lord is my shepherd". In Latin, it is known by the incipit, "".  The Book of Psalms is part of the third section of the Hebrew Bible, and a book of the Christian Old Testament. In the slightly different numbering system used in the Greek Septuagint and Latin Vulgate translations of the Bible, this psalm is Psalm 22.
 
Like many psalms, Psalm 23 is used in both Jewish and Christian liturgies. It has often been set to music. Haredi educator Tziporah Heller referred to it as perhaps the best-known of the psalms due to "its universal message of trust in God, and its simplicity."

Text

Hebrew Bible version
The following is the Hebrew text of Psalm 23:

English translation (King James Version)

 A Psalm of David. The  is my shepherd; I shall not want.
 He maketh me to lie down in green pastures: he leadeth me beside the still waters.
 He restoreth my soul: he leadeth me in the paths of righteousness for his name's sake.
 Yea, though I walk through the valley of the shadow of death, I will fear no evil: for thou art with me; thy rod and thy staff they comfort me.
 Thou preparest a table before me in the presence of mine enemies: thou anointest my head with oil; my cup runneth over.
 Surely goodness and mercy shall follow me all the days of my life: and I will dwell in the house of the  forever.

Interpretation of themes

The theme of God as a shepherd was common in ancient Israel and Mesopotamia. For example, King Hammurabi, in the conclusion to his famous legal code, wrote: "I am the shepherd who brings well-being and abundant prosperity; my rule is just.... so that the strong might not oppress the weak, and that even the orphan and the widow might be treated with justice." This imagery and language were well known to the community that created the Psalm and was easily imported into its worship.

Psalm 23 portrays God as a good shepherd, feeding (verse 1) and leading (verse 3) his flock. The "rod and staff" (verse 4) are also the implements of a shepherd. Some commentators see the shepherd imagery pervading the entire psalm. It is known that the shepherd is to know each sheep by name, thus when God is given the analogy of a shepherd, he is not only a protector but also the caretaker. God, as the caretaker, leads the sheep to green pastures (verse 2) and still waters (verse 2) because he knows that each of his sheep must be personally led to be fed. Thus, without its shepherd, the sheep would die either by a predator or of starvation, since sheep are known for their helplessness without their shepherd.

J. Douglas MacMillan argues that verse 5 ("Thou preparest a table before me") refers to the "old oriental shepherding practice" of using little raised tables to feed sheep. Similarly, "Thou anointest my head with oil" may refer to an ancient form of backliner – the oil is poured on wounds, and repels flies. MacMillan also notes that verse 6 ("Goodness and mercy shall follow me") reminds him of two loyal sheepdogs coming behind the flock.

The header or first verse of the Psalm ascribes authorship to King David, said in the Hebrew Scriptures to have been a field shepherd himself as a youth. However, some scholars do not agree with this attributed authorship and hypothesize various other possibilities, commonly dating it to the post-exilic period.

Taken together, Psalms 22, 23, and 24 are seen by some as shepherd psalms, where the good shepherd lays down his life for the sheep as a suffering servant and king.

Uses in Judaism
Psalm 23 is traditionally sung during the third Shabbat meal as well as before the first and second in some of the Jewish communities during the Kiddush. It is also commonly recited in the presence of a deceased person, such as by those keeping watch over the body before burial, and at the funeral service itself.

Uses in the Christian tradition

For Christians, the image of God as a shepherd evokes connections not only with David but with Jesus, described as the "Good Shepherd" in the Gospel of John. The phrase "the valley of the shadow of death" is often taken as an allusion to the eternal life given by Jesus.

Orthodox Christians typically include this Psalm in the prayers of preparation for receiving the Eucharist.

The Reformation inspired widespread efforts in western Europe to make biblical texts available in vernacular languages. One of the most popular early English versions was the Geneva Bible (1557). The most widely recognized version of the psalm in English today is undoubtedly the one drawn from the King James Bible (1611).

In the Catholic Church, this psalm is assigned to the Daytime hours of Sunday Week 2 in the Liturgy of the Hours and is sung as a responsorial in Masses for the dead. The Church of England's Book of Common Prayer, it is appointed to be read on the evening of the fourth day of the month.

The psalm is a popular passage for memorization and is often used in sermons.

Use in funerals
In the twentieth century, Psalm 23 became particularly associated with funeral liturgies in the English-speaking world, and films with funeral scenes often depict a graveside recitation of the psalm. Official liturgies of English-speaking churches were slow to adopt this practice. The Book of Common Prayer has only Psalms 39 and 90 in its Order for the Burial of the Dead, and in the Episcopal Church in the United States, Psalm 23 was not used for funerals until the 1928 revision of the prayer book.

Musical settings

Metrical versions

In Christianity, a number of paraphrased versions of Psalm 23 emerged after the Protestant Reformation in the form of Metrical psalms — poetic versions that could be set to hymn tunes. An early metrical version of the psalm in English was made in 1565 by Thomas Sternhold. Other notable metrical versions to emerge from this period include those from The Bay Psalm Book (1640), the Sidney Psalms by Philip Sidney, and settings by George Herbert and Isaac Watts.

One of the best known metrical versions of Psalm 23 is the Christian hymn, "The Lord's My Shepherd", a translation first published in the 1650 Scottish Psalter. Although widely attributed to the English Parliamentarian Francis Rous, the text was the result of significant editing by a translating committee in the 1640s before publication. The hymn is one of the most popular hymns amongst English-speaking congregations today, and it is traditionally sung to the hymn tune Crimond, generally attributed to Jessie Seymour Irvine. Other melodies, such as Brother James' Air or Amazing Grace, Belmont, Evan, Martyrdom, Orlington, and Wiltshire may also be used.

Another popular Christian hymn to be based on Psalm 23 is "The King of Love My Shepherd Is" by Henry Baker (1868).

Liturgical and classical

 Heinrich Schütz: a setting of a metric paraphrase in German, "Der Herr ist mein getreuer Hirt", SWV 120, for the Becker Psalter (1628)
 Bach: Cantata No.112 Der Herr ist mein getreuer Hirt, BWV 112
 James Leith Macbeth Bain: hymn tune Brother James' Air
 Rabbi Ben Zion Shenker: Notable performance by Itzhak Perlman and Cantor Yitzchak Meir Helfgot
 Lennox Berkeley: Op. 91, No. 1 (1975)
 Bernstein: Chichester Psalms (Hebrew, in Part 2, together with Psalm 2)
 Bruckner: Psalm 22 Der Herr regieret mich WAB 34
 Noah Creshevsky: Psalm XXIII (2003)
 Paul Creston: Psalm XXIII (1945)
 Dvořák: verses 1–4, No. 4 of his Biblical Songs (1894)
 Howard Goodall
 Alan Hovhaness: Symphony No. 12, movements 2 and 4
 Herbert Howells: Hymnus Paradisi
 Jessie Seymour Irvine: hymn tune Crimond
 Friedrich Kiel: verse 4 in No. 1 of his Six Motets, Op. 82
 Franz Liszt
 Albert Hay Malotte
 Clément Marot (in Latin)
 Alfred Newman in the film David and Bathsheba
 George Rochberg
 Miklós Rózsa
 Edmund Rubbra: Three Psalms, Op. 61 (No. 2)
 John Rutter: The Lord Is My Shepherd (1978), included in his Requiem (1985)
 Franz Schubert: "Gott meine Zuversicht" ("Gott ist mein Hirt", 1820) (German text by Moses Mendelssohn)
 Charles Villiers Stanford: "The Lord is my shepherd" (1886)
 Randall Thompson
 Benjamin Till: "Mizmor L'David" (2020, in Hebrew)
 Ralph Vaughan Williams
 Alexander Zemlinsky: Op. 14, (1910) for chorus and orchestra
 Rabbi Shlomo Carlebach: Gam Ki Elech b'Gey Tzalmavet Lo Irah Rah Ki Atah Imadi. גם כי אלך

Songs

1958: Duke Ellington – "Part VI" from Black, Brown and Beige with Mahalia Jackson
1966: The Moody Blues – "23rd Psalm" from the album The Magnificent Moodies deLuxe Edition (not released until 2014)
1966: Ed Ames – "My Cup Runneth Over" RCA Victor single from the Musical Production "I Do!, I Do!"
1972: Dave Cousins – "Lay Down" from the album Bursting at the Seams
1977: Dennis Brown – "Here I Come" from the album Wolf & Leopards
1977: Peter Tosh – "Jah Guide" from the album Equal Rights
1977: Pink Floyd – "Sheep" from the album Animals
1978: Patti Smith Group – "Privilege (Set Me Free)" from the album Easter
1980: Grateful Dead – "Alabama Getaway" from the album Go to Heaven
1981: Venom – "Welcome To Hell" from the album Welcome to Hell
1982: Keith Green – "The Lord is my shepherd" from the album Songs for the Shepherd
1983: Marillion – "Forgotten Sons" from the album Script for a Jester's Tear
1985: Judy Collins – "The Lord is my shepherd" from the album Amazing Grace
1988: Diamanda Galás – "The Lord is my shepherd" from the album You Must Be Certain of the Devil
1988: U2 – "Love Rescue Me" from the album Rattle and Hum
1989: Lil' Louis – "Blackout" from the album From The Mind Of Lil Louis
1990: Bobby McFerrin – "The 23rd Psalm" from the album Medicine Music
1993: Alpha Blondy – "Psaume 23" from the album Jerusalem
1993: Christian Death – Psalm (Maggot's Lair) from album Path of Sorrows
1994: Howard Goodall – theme to The Vicar of Dibley, later covered by Katherine Jenkins and The Choirboys
1995: Coolio feat. L.V. – "Gangsta's Paradise"
1995: Michael W. Smith – "As It Is In Heaven" from I'll Lead You Home
1995: Tupac Shakur – "So Many Tears" from the album Me Against The World
1996: Cissy Houston, (Whitney Houston's mother) – "The Lord is my shepherd" from The Preacher's Wife: Original Soundtrack Album
1996: Staind “Four Walls” from the album Tormented
1997: Christopher Wallace (The Notorious B.I.G.) – "You're Nobody ('Til Somebody Kills You)" from the album Life After Death
1998: Colin Mawby – recording with Charlotte Church
1998: Kathy Troccoli – "Psalm 23" from Corner of Eden
1999: E Nomine – "Psalm 23" from the album Das Testament
1999: Jonathan Elias – "Forgiveness" from the album The Prayer Cycle
1999: Ky-mani Marley – "Lord is my shepherd" from the album The Journey
2000: Mark Knopfler – "Baloney Again" from the album Sailing to Philadelphia
2000: Marilyn Manson – "In The Shadow Of The Valley Of Death" from the album Holy Wood
2001: Dan Nichols – "Psalm 23" from the album Be Strong
2002: Boards of Canada – "From One Source All Things Depend" from the album Geogaddi
2003: Lucinda Williams – "Atonement" from the album World Without Tears
2004: Kanye West – "Jesus Walks" from the album The College Dropout
2004: Megadeth – "Shadow of Deth" from the album The System Has Failed
2004: OverClocked Remix – "Beneath the Surface (Aquatic Ambiance)" from Kong in Concert
2005: Ministry (band) – "No W (Redux)" from Rantology
2005: The Tossers - "The Valley of the Shadow of Death" from the album The Valley of the Shadow of Death
2007: Group 1 Crew – "Forgive Me" from the album Group 1 Crew
2007: Dream Theater – "In The Presence Of Enemies Part 2" from the album Systematic Chaos
2008: Jon Foreman – "The House of God, Forever" from the EP, Summer
2008: The Offspring – "Hammerhead" from the album Rise and Fall, Rage and Grace
2009: India.Arie, MC Lyte – "Psalms 23" from the album Testimony: Vol. 2, Love & Politics
2009: Rick Ross – "Valley of Death" from the album Deeper Than Rap
2010: Nas & Damian Marley – "Strong Will Continue" from the album Distant Relatives
2011: Hollywood Undead – "Hear Me Now" from the album American Tragedy
2012: Shawn James – "Through the Valley" from the album Shadows
2013: J. Cole (featuring Kendrick Lamar) — "Forbidden Fruit"
2016: The Last Shadow Puppets – "Everything You've Come to Expect" from the album of the same name

See also
Valley of the Shadow of Death, 1855 Roger Fenton photograph

References

Works cited

External links

 
 
 Psalm 23 in Parallel English (JPS translation) and Hebrew
 BibleStudyTools.com – various translations and commentaries
 Psalm 23 at biblegateway.com
 Hymns for Psalm 23 hymnary.org
 Hebrew text, translation, transliteration, recorded melodies from The Zemirot Database
 Tehillim – Psalm 23 (Judaica Press) translation with Rashi's commentary.
 

023
Works attributed to David
Shepherds
Zemirot